This article lists the members of the Parliament of Finland from 2015 to 2019. The 37th eduskunta follows the parliamentary election held on 19 April 2015. There are 200 MPs in the Parliament.

As elected
The parties attributed to certain members of Parliament are those to which said MPs belonged on the day of the election. Therefore, for example, members of Blue Reform are listed as being part of the Finns Party, as that was the case on 19 April 2015.

Midterm replacements
 Paavo Väyrynen (Centre Party) was replaced by Mikko Kärnä of the same party on 30 April 2015.
 Pirkko Ruohonen-Lerner (Finns Party) was replaced by Leena Meri of the same party on 7 May 2015.
 Carl Haglund (Swedish People's Party of Finland) was replaced by Veronica Rehn-Kivi of the same party on 1 August 2016.
 Olli Rehn (Centre Party) was replaced by Paula Lehtomäki of the same party on 1 February 2017.
 Paula Lehtomäki (Centre Party) was replaced by Pekka Puska of the same party on 9 February 2017.
 Nazima Razmyar (SDP) was replaced by Pilvi Torsti of the same party on 9 June 2017.
 Hanna Mäntylä (NA) was replaced by Matti Torvinen of the Finns Party on 1 July 2017.
 Alexander Stubb (National Coalition Party) was replaced by Pia Kauma of the same party on 1 August 2017.
 Elsi Katainen (Centre Party) was replaced by Eero Reijonen of the same party on 1 March 2018.
 Outi Mäkelä (National Coalition Party) was replaced by Mia Laiho of the same party on 5 March 2018.
 Sanna Lauslahti (National Coalition Party) was replaced by Raija Vahasalo of the same party on 10 April 2018.
 Mikko Kärnä (Centre Party) was replaced by Paavo Väyrynen of the Citizens' Party on 12 June 2018.
 Susanna Huovinen (SDP) was replaced by Riitta Mäkinen of the same party on 15 June 2018.
 Mirja Vehkaperä (Centre Party) was replaced by Eija Nivala of the same party on 18 June 2018.
 Eija Nivala (Centre Party) was replaced by Hanna-Leena Mattila of the same party on 25 June 2018.

References 

2015